Dancing with Crime is a 1947 British film noir film directed by John Paddy Carstairs, starring Richard Attenborough,  Barry K. Barnes  and  Sheila Sim. It was shot at Southall Studios with sets designed by the art director Andrew Mazzei.

Plot

Boyhood friends and comrades in the Army, Ted Peters (Richard Attenborough) and Dave Robinson (Bill Owen) are back in civvies. Ted becomes a taxi driver and hopes to marry Joy Goodall (Sheila Sim), a pretty chorus girl.  Dave, seeking easy money, joins a gang which has its headquarters in a suburban palais-de-danse. The gang is headed by a man called Gregory (Barry Jones),  and includes Paul Baker (Barry K. Barnes), and petty crooks Sniffy and Pogson.  Ted refuses to join them.

Cast
 Richard Attenborough as Ted Peters
 Barry K. Barnes as Paul Baker
 Sheila Sim as Joy Goodall
 Garry Marsh as Sgt. Murray
 John Warwick as Det. Insp. Carter
 Judy Kelly as Toni
 Barry Jones as Gregory
 Bill Rowbotham as Dave Robinson
 Cyril Chamberlain as Sniffy 
 Peter Croft as Johnny
 Dirk Bogarde as Police Radio Caller (uncredited)
 Patricia Dainton as Pam (uncredited)
 Diana Dors as Annette (uncredited)
 Danny Green as Sid (uncredited)
 Bartlett Mullins as Club Barman (uncredited) 
 John Salew as Pogson (uncredited)
 Dennis Wyndham as Sam (uncredited)

Production
Richard Attenborough and Sheila Sim were married in real life - this was their first movie together.
It was shot at Cromwell Studios, Southall. Attenborough was borrowed from the Boulting Brothers. Fiming was difficult due to the freezing cold weather. The film features an early appearance by Diana Dors.

Reception
Variety called it "fashioned on formula grounds."

References

External links
 
Dancing with Crime at BFI
Dancing with Crime at Letterbox DVD

1947 films
1947 crime films
British crime films
Films shot at Southall Studios
Films set in London
Films directed by John Paddy Carstairs
Films scored by Benjamin Frankel
Paramount Pictures films
British black-and-white films
1940s English-language films
1940s British films